Don or Donald Lee may refer to:

Entertainment
Don Lee (broadcaster) (1880–1934), American pioneer television executive in California
Don Lee (author) (born 1959), American novelist and creative writing professor
Haki R. Madhubuti (Don Luther Lee, born 1942), African-American author, educator, and poet
Ma Dong-seok (Don Lee, born 1971), South Korean-born American actor
Don Lee (musician) (1941–1995), American country and rock musician and producer
Don Lee (accordionist) (1930–2015), American accordionist who had a hit with "Echo, Echo, Echo" in 1957

Sports
Don Lee (baseball) (born 1934), pitcher in Major League Baseball
Don Lee (American football) (born 1970s), head coach of the Belhaven College Blazers
Donald Lee (American football) (born 1980), American football tight end
Donald Lee (cricketer) (1933–2016), South African cricketer

Other
Don Lee (politician) (born 1960), state representative in Colorado, 1998–2006
Donald Lee (politician), member of parliament from Eastern Cape, South Africa
Donald J. Lee (1927–2011), U.S. federal judge
Donald Woodward Lee (1910–1971), American philologist and professor of English

See also
 Don Li (born 1982), Hong Kong singer/actor
 Don Li (composer/musician), Swiss composer
 454326 Donlee, a minor planet and main-belt asteroid named after scientist Don Lee
 List of people with surname Lee